"High School" is a song by Trinidadian-American rapper and singer Nicki Minaj featuring American rapper Lil Wayne for Minaj's reissued second studio album Pink Friday: Roman Reloaded – The Re-Up (2012). It was released on April 16, 2013, by Young Money, Cash Money, and Republic as the third single from the record. The song was written and produced by Boi-1da and T-Minus, with additional songwriting provided by Minaj and Lil Wayne. "High School" is a hip hop and R&B song that lyrically discusses adultery. The song peaked at number 64 on the U.S. Billboard Hot 100, and additionally reached numbers 15 and 20 on the Billboard Hot Rap Songs and Hot R&B/Hip-Hop Songs component charts. Elsewhere, the track charted moderately throughout international singles charts, including number 31 on the UK Singles Chart, and has been certified Silver in the country for moving 200,000 units as of December 2021. It has also been certified 2× Platinum in the United States by the RIAA as of June 2022.

An accompanying music video was directed by Benny Boom, in which Minaj is depicted in the midst of an affair with Lil Wayne. The clip additionally includes footage of the "Pink Pill", a variation of the "Beats Pro" speaker created by Beats Electronics in collaboration with Minaj.

In 2021 the song gained popularity on the social media app TikTok, and the song's audio has accumulated over 1 million videos propelling to the song to accumulate over 100 million streams on Spotify. The song also gained popularity in Asia, reaching the top 50 on the Indian Apple Music Charts, whilst also reaching the top of 100 of Shazam in many countries worldwide such as Singapore, Thailand, South Korea, Malaysia and more.

Background 
On November 29, Minaj opened a poll to determinate by the fans which song of the album should be the next single. "I'm Legit" won the poll with the most votes, while "High School" placed second, followed by "Up In Flames" third, "Hell Yeah" in fourth, and "I Endorse These Strippers" in fifth.  A video was shot for the single on March 11.
When the album dropped, fans noticed that "High School" reminded them of a mixtape song called "Hood Story". It was included on her first mixtape called Playtime is Over. Nicki recycled the verses "he said he came from Jamaica" and "he owned a couple of acres". At the end of Hood Story, Nicki whispered, "To Be Continued", but it was never finished until now. She indirectly confirmed this speculation by retweeting "HOOD STORY PART 2".

Critical reception 
"High School" received mostly positive reviews from critics. Jeffries from AllMusic said that the song "restores faith with three-and-half minutes of driven, witty filth." He also noticed that "The Re-Up comes on with such an anti-Roman, back-to-basics attitude that it slowly slithers up to the Wayne track. Women in Hip Hop website gave a very positive review to the track saying that "aggressive voice and flow is a winning factor on this song, Lil Wayne did well and the catchy chorus helped round it out."

Bené Viera from VH1 Tuner appreciate Minaj's "storytelling capabilities." Jesal Padania from RapReviews commented negatively saying that "it's another song that doesn't really cut it," and it's "not compared to 'Roman Reloaded'."

Music video

Background
In an interview in Dubai, Nicki confirmed that she will be filming a music video for "High School" or "I'm Legit" in 2013. On February 22, 2013, a fan asked Nicki on UStream when will the video be shot. She responded that she will shoot it in a few weeks, confirming the shoot on March 6. The video was shot on March 11 by Benny Boom in Los Angeles. The music video is confirmed to be released on April 2, 2013, globally, where Minaj will interview with MTV after its premiere and answer questions via Twitter with the hashtag #AskNicki. The video was released at 10.53AM on MTV and an Explicit Version of the video was released at 6:30PM the same day on VEVO. Minaj posted some pictures of the video shoot on March 12, 2013. On March 19, Minaj posted a behind the scenes video filmed and produced by Grizz Lee. She appears in a Jacuzzi while wearing a neon green bikini. She changes multiple times and is carried around set by a bodyguard. Wayne and Birdman also appear in the video. He suggests that she films in her birthday suit. Nicki originally wanted him to play her husband in the clip. "I would've loved that," he tells her.

Synopsis
The video begins with an intro for the participants in the video, including Birdman and actor Emilio Rivera as "El Jefe" who played the "don" in the video. The video then cuts to Minaj walking poolside in a pink monokini in a beautiful sunlit scene. Lil Wayne and Birdman are shown pulling up to hand over a Louis Vuitton duffle bag to a mafia don. Minaj plays the mistress of the don. Wayne and Birdman then go inside the mafia leaders mansion to secure the deal, and as Minaj is seen walking down the stairs, Wayne appears to be gazed in awe at the sight of Minaj. Throughout the video, Minaj is seen in many revealing outfits, some include a yellow monokini, and lingerie. As the meeting is on, Minaj is seen meeting eyes with Wayne as she walks past. Wayne then raps his verse poolside as well, with video girls dancing beside him. Minaj and Wayne then have a seductive-like love scene where Minaj appears in lingerie, and Wayne is seen shirtless. Various clips of Minaj in a Jacuzzi and  backyard sporting a yellow dress are shown. Then as the mafia "don" has left the meeting, Birdman tells Wayne to go flirt with Minaj. More clips of Minaj's and Wayne love scene are shown. Minaj then disguises herself in a mask and black hoodie and robs the "don". Ending the video, Wayne is seen waving down a helicopter, as he and Minaj escape the scene.
The pink pill appeared in the music video.

Live performances
Minaj performed High School for the  first time on her Pink Friday Reloaded Tour stop in Perth, Australia during a melody. The single was also performed on Jimmy Kimmel Live but was unaired due to timing. Minaj and Lil Wayne performed High School at the 2013 Billboard Awards. The performance controversially featured Minaj giving Wayne a lap dance.

Credits and personnel
Recording:
Recorded at: Studio Malibu, Malibu CA & The Hit Factory Criteria, Miami FL
Mixed at: Studio Malibu, Malibu CA
Mastered at: Chris Athens Masters, Austin TX

Personnel:
Writers: Onika Maraj, Dwayne Carter, Matthew Samuels, Tyler Williams, Carly Jordan
Producers: Boi-1da & T-Minus
Recorded by: Ariel Chobaz & Michael "Banger" Cadahia
Mixed by: Ariel Chobaz & Boi-1da
Mastered by: Chris Athens

The credits for "High School" are adapted from the liner notes of Pink Friday: Roman Reloaded - The Re-Up.

Charts and certifications

Weekly charts

Year-end

Certifications

Radio history

References

External links

2013 singles
Nicki Minaj songs
Lil Wayne songs
Cash Money Records singles
Songs written by Nicki Minaj
Songs written by Lil Wayne
Song recordings produced by Boi-1da
Song recordings produced by T-Minus (record producer)
Music videos directed by Benny Boom
2012 songs
Songs written by Boi-1da
Songs written by T-Minus (record producer)